Henry Baker may refer to:

Arts and entertainment
 Henry Baker (author) (1734–1766), English poet and essayist
 Henry Aaron Baker (1753–1836), Irish architect
 Henry Judd Baker (died 2016), American actor
 Henry Baker, fictional character in Arthur Conan Doyle's "The Adventure of the Blue Carbuncle"

Military
 Henry Baker (soldier) (died 1689), Anglo-Irish soldier
 Sir Henry Baker, 2nd Baronet (1787–1859), British naval officer
 Charles Baker (Medal of Honor) (a.k.a. Henry Baker, 1809–1891), American Civil War sailor and Medal of Honor recipient
 Henry E. Baker (1857–1928), third African American to enter the United States Naval Academy
 Henry Cook Baker (fl. 1899–1902), British army sergeant during the Boer War

Politics and law
 Henry Moore Baker (1841–1912), U.S. Representative from New Hampshire
 Henry Baker (politician) (1890–1968), Australian politician, Tasmanian Leader of the Opposition and President of the Legislative Council
 Henry Harold Peter Baker (1915–2004), Canadian politician in Saskatchewan

Science and medicine
 Henry Baker (naturalist) (1698–1774), English naturalist
 Henry Albert Baker (1848–1934), American orthodontist
 Henry Brooks Baker (1837–1920), American public health pioneer
 H. F. Baker (Henry Frederick Baker, 1866–1956), English mathematician
 Henry Baker (computer scientist) ( late 20th century), American computer scientist

Others
 Henry Williams Baker (1821–1877), English hymn writer
 Henry Baker (baseball) (1901–?), American Negro league baseball player
 Henry Baker (cricketer) (1904–1926), Australian-born New Zealand cricketer

Other uses
 Henry Baker College, college in Kerala, India
 Henry W. Baker House, American historic site in Plymouth, Michigan

See also
 Harry Baker (disambiguation)
 Henry Baker Tristram (1822–1906), English clergyman and ornithologist